Shubhra Gupta is an Indian film critic, writer and columnist for The Indian Express from New Delhi, India. She received the Ramnath Goenka Award for Best Writing on Cinema in 2012. She was a member of the Central Board of Film Certification from 2012 to 2015. She is the author of 50 Films That Changed Bollywood, 1995-2015.

Career
Gupta began reviewing films in addition to her work as a journalist in the early 1990s. After more than twenty years as a film critic, she wrote the book 50 Films That Changed Bollywood, 1995-2015 about the development of the film industry in India.

In 2011, she was appointed to the Central Board of Film Certification for a three-year term.

She curates and conducts The Indian Express Film Club, in Delhi and Mumbai. The screening is followed by animated discussion, which she moderates. She is a frequent traveller to film festivals in Europe and has served on national and international juries.

Books 
 50 Films That Changed Bollywood, 1995-2015

Awards
 2012 Ramnath Goenka Award for the Best Writing on Film

References

External links 
Shubhra Gupta on Rotten Tomatoes

Living people
Date of birth missing (living people)
Indian film critics
Indian columnists
Indian women columnists
Year of birth missing (living people)
Indian women writers